Jalan Sesama is the Indonesian adaptation of the American children's television series, Sesame Street. The series was produced by Creative Indigo Productions in association with Sesame Workshop.

On 13 April 2020, due to the COVID-19 pandemic, the series re-aired on TVRI as part of Belajar dari Rumah programming block sponsored by Ministry of Education and Culture.

History
In March 2006, the series was created with funding by the United States government through USAID.

The series debuted on 18 February 2008 on Trans7.

Content 
The program's set resembles an Indonesian neighborhood, with clay-tiled houses, a snack cart, and a motorcycle taxi stop.

Messaging 
Jalan Sesama teaches watchers about diversity, environmental awareness, and positive character building.

From encouraging healthy habits to dealing with the aftermath of a flood, Jalan Sesama tackles serious issues impacting the children of Indonesia.

Season 5 of the show had creativity as its main theme.

Characters
Momon - A 5-year-old yellow monster boy who is very neat and loves drawing and counting.
Putri - An active and extroverted young girl who is always asking Momon for help.
Tantan - A wise orangutan that settles every dispute on Jalan Sesama.
Jabrik - A baby rhinoceros that is always complaining and laughing.

Episodes 
The series consisted of about 52 half-hour episodes each season, with a total of 156 episodes over three seasons.

Impact 
A 2010 study found that children who watched the program showed greater improvements in cognitive skills, cultural awareness, environmental awareness, health and safety knowledge, literacy, mathematics, and social development than children who had not watched the program.

References

2008 Indonesian television series debuts
Sesame Street international co-productions
Television shows featuring puppetry
Indonesian children's television series
Indonesian television series based on American television series
2016 Indonesian television series endings